Drummoyne is an electoral district of the Legislative Assembly in the Australian state of New South Wales. It is represented by John Sidoti. Originally elected as a member of the Liberal Party; Sidoti stood down from the party in 2021 whilst under investigation by the Independent Commission Against Corruption

Drummoyne includes the suburbs and localities of Abbotsford, Breakfast Point, Cabarita, Canada Bay, Chiswick, Cockatoo Island, Concord, Concord West, Drummoyne, Five Dock, Homebush (northern part), Liberty Grove, Mortlake, North Strathfield, Rhodes, Rodd Island, Spectacle Island, Rodd Point, Russell Lea and Wareemba. .

History
Drummoyne was created in 1913. With the introduction of proportional representation, it was absorbed into the multi-member electorate of Ryde, but recreated in 1927. For much of the early 1900s, it was a marginal seat. Between the 1960s and 2000s, Drummoyne was a -leaning seat. Currently, the electoral district is represented by Independent John Sidoti, formerly of the Liberal Party.

Notably, the electorate was the scene of future Liberal Prime Minister John Howard's first run for parliament, in 1968.

Members for Drummoyne

Election results

References

Drummoyne
Drummoyne
1913 establishments in Australia
Drummoyne
1920 disestablishments in Australia
Drummoyne
1927 establishments in Australia